Annelie Larsson (born 23 August 1964) is a Swedish rower. She competed at the 1984 Summer Olympics and the 1988 Summer Olympics.

References

1964 births
Living people
Swedish female rowers
Olympic rowers of Sweden
Rowers at the 1984 Summer Olympics
Rowers at the 1988 Summer Olympics
Sportspeople from Stockholm
20th-century Swedish women